The Guarda Football Association (Associação de Futebol da Guarda, abrv. AF Guarda) is the district governing body for the all football competitions in the Portuguese district of Guarda. It is also the regulator of the clubs registered in the district.

Notable clubs in the Guarda FA
 Guarda
 SC Mêda

Current Divisions - 2013–14 Season
The AF Guarda runs the following divisions covering the fourth and fifth tiers of the Portuguese football league system.

1ª divisão

Associação Cultural Desportiva do Soito
Associação Desportiva Recreativa e Cultural de Aguiar da Beira
Centro Cultural Desportivo e Recreativo de Vila Cortês do Mondego
Clube de Futebol  Os Vilanovenses
Clube Desportivo de Gouveia
Ginásio Clube Figueirense
Grupo Desportivo de Trancoso
Grupo Desportivo de Vila Nova de Foz Coa-
Sporting Clube Celoricense
Sporting Clube da Mêda
Sporting Clube da Sociedade de Instrução e Recreio de Paços da Serra
Sporting Clube de Sabugal
Sporting Clube de Vilar Formoso
União Desportiva  Os Pinhelenses

2ª divisão

Associação Cultural e Desportiva Estrela de Almeida
Associação Cultural e Desportiva de Vila Franca das Naves
Associação Desportiva de Fornos de Algodres
Futebol Clube de Pala
Grupo Cultural e Recreativo Casal de Cinza
Guarda Unida Desportiva
Mileu Guarda Sport Clube

Winners

1947/48: CF Gouveienses
1948/49: SC Gouveia
1949/50: União da Guarda
1950/51: União da Guarda
1951/52: Amieiros Verdes-Manteigas
1952/53: CF Gouveienses
1953/54: Not Held
1954/55: Sporting de Gouveia
1955/56: Sporting de Gouveia
1956/57: Not Held
1957/58: Sporting de Gouveia
1958/59: ACD Guarda
1959/60: Sporting de Gouveia
1960/61: Sporting de Gouveia
1961/62: ACD Guarda
1962/63: Sporting de Gouveia
1963/64: ACD Guarda
1964/65: CD Gouveia
1965/66: CD Gouveia
1966/67: CD Gouveia
1967/68: ACD Guarda
1968/69: SC Gonçalense
1969/70: GD Trancoso
1970/71: SC Celorico
1971/72: Vilar Formoso
1972/73: ACD Guarda
1973/74: Os Pinhelenses
1974/75: Os Vilanovenses
1975/76: GD Trancoso
1976/77: SC Gonçalense
1977/78: Os Vilanovenses
1978/79: AD Fornos de Algodres1979/80: Os Vilanovenses
1980/81: Desp. Seia
1981/82: AD S. Romão

1982/83: CD Gouveia
1983/84: Desp. Seia
1984/85: Os Vilanovenses
1985/86: Desp. Seia
1986/87: Os Vilanovenses
1987/88: AD S. Romão
1988/89: SC Sabugal
1989/90: GD Foz Côa
1990/91: Desp. Seia
1991/92: Os Pinhelenses
1992/93: SC Celorico
1993/94: AD Fornos de Algodres1994/95: GD Foz Côa
1995/96: AD S. Romão
1996/97: Os Pinhelenses
1997/98: AD S. Romão
1998/99: Mileu Guarda SC
1999/00: CD Gouveia
2000/01: Mileu Guarda SC
2001/02: CD Gouveia
2002/03: ADRC Aguiar da Beira2003/04: Souropires
2004/05: AD Fornos de Algodres
2005/06: Desp. Seia
2006/07: Ginásio Clube Figueirense
2007/08: AD Fornos de Algodres
2008/09: SC Mêda
2009/10: ADRC Aguiar da Beira
2010/11: SC Mêda
2011/12: ADRC Aguiar da Beira
2012/13: AD Manteigas
2013/14: CD Gouveia
2014/15: Sabugal
2015/16: CD Gouveia
2016/17: AD Fornos de Algodres

See also
Portuguese District Football Associations
Portuguese football competitions
List of football clubs in Portugal

References

External links
Associação de Futebol da Guarda 

Guarda
Guarda District